Austin Mack (born August 31, 1997) is an American football wide receiver who is a free agent. He played college football for the Ohio State Buckeyes. He signed as an undrafted free agent with the New York Giants in 2020.

Early life and high school
Mack grew up in Fort Wayne, Indiana and attended Bishop Luers High School. He had 69 receptions for 1,062 yards and 15 touchdowns and was the runner up to Indiana's Mr. Football award as a junior. In his senior season he caught 41 passes for 805 yards and six touchdowns and had to move to running back midway through the season due to injuries on the team and rushed for 718 yards. Rated a four-star recruit and the best collegiate prospect in Indiana by Rivals.com, Mack committed to play college football at Ohio State going into his senior year over offers from Notre Dame, Michigan, and Tennessee.

College career
Mack was a member of the Ohio State Buckeyes for four seasons and joined the team as an early enrollee. Mack played mostly on special teams as a true freshman with two receptions for 15 yards on offense. As a sophomore, he caught 24 passes for 343 yards and two touchdowns. Mack scored his first collegiate touchdown on September 16, 2017, against Army. He had 26 receptions for 331 yards and one touchdown before suffering a season end ankle injury eight games into his junior season. As a senior, Mack caught 27 passes for 361 yards and three touchdowns. He finished his collegiate career with 79 receptions, 1,050 yards and six touchdowns.

Professional career

New York Giants
Mack signed with the New York Giants as an undrafted free agent on April 25, 2020, shortly after the conclusion of the 2020 NFL Draft. He was waived on September 5, 2020, and signed to the practice squad the next day. On October 3, Mack was elevated to the active roster, but he was listed inactive for the team's game the next day against the Los Angeles Rams and was subsequently reverted to the practice squad. Mack was signed to the active 53-man roster on October 13, 2020, and made his NFL debut on October 18, catching one pass for one yard in a 20–19 win over the Washington Football Team. On November 8, he caught four passes for 72 yards in a 23–20 win against Washington, including a 50-yard reception from Daniel Jones.

On August 31, 2021, Mack was placed on injured reserve. He was released on September 7.

Tennessee Titans
Mack signed with the Tennessee Titans' practice squad on November 23, 2021. He was released on November 30.

San Francisco 49ers
On December 6, 2021, Mack was signed to the San Francisco 49ers practice squad. He signed a reserve/future contract with the 49ers on February 2, 2022. He was waived/injured on August 22, and placed on injured reserve. He was released on August 27.

References

External links
New York Giants bio
Ohio State Buckeyes bio

1997 births
Living people
American football wide receivers
Ohio State Buckeyes football players
Players of American football from Fort Wayne, Indiana
New York Giants players
Tennessee Titans players
San Francisco 49ers players